This article lists major evacuations conducted by several countries as a result of the COVID-19 pandemic.

The SARS-CoV-2 virus was first identified in the city of Wuhan, Hubei, China in mid-December 2019, when a group of people developed a pneumonia without clear causes, and existing treatments were found to be ineffective. The novel coronavirus has similar characteristics to severe acute respiratory syndrome (SARS) and Middle East respiratory syndrome (MERS). Within a number of weeks, several thousand people in Hubei's provincial capital of Wuhan were infected, and the Chinese central government imposed strict containment measures, including a lockdown of Hubei itself.

Due to the effective lockdown of Wuhan and Hubei, and the continued growth of the outbreak in these locations, several countries planned to evacuate their citizens and/or diplomatic staff from the area. This was done primarily through chartered flights of the home nations, which were provided prior clearance by Chinese authorities. Australia, Belgium, France, Germany, India, Indonesia, Japan, the Philippines, Sri Lanka, Thailand, and the United States were among the first to plan the evacuation of their citizens. Pakistan has said that it will not be evacuating any citizens from China due to lack of domestic facilities to help treat Pakistanis who may be infected.

International evacuations

Statistical overview

Military and organisation evacuations 
The Peace Corps evacuated all volunteers, estimated at over 7,000 and suspended all volunteer programmes.

Major civilian evacuations 
From 15 March to 15 April, the Polish flag carrier LOT flew over 54,000 people, including Poles and other nationals, under the "LOTDoDomu" (LOT Flight Home) programme.

The government of India plans to evacuate citizens from around the world through the "Vande Bharat Mission" in May. The first phase, with over 15,000 Indian citizens planned to be evacuated from 7 to 13 May, focuses mostly on the Gulf states and other areas with high concentrations of Indians such as the US and UK, while the second phase, starting 15 May, will shift efforts to other European and Central Asian countries. It has been predicted that this evacuation will surpass the 1990 airlift of Indians from Kuwait to be the biggest in the country's history, with estimates ranging as high as 192k-250k nationals to be brought home. As India closed its airspace to international flights in March, these flights are crucial for both citizens wanting to return to India as well as anyone who wants to leave the country via outbound flights.

List of international evacuations

Large-scale domestic evacuations

France 
The French government has strategically moved coronavirus patients from harder-hit areas to those with less cases to spread out the strain on the hospital system. Evacuations done for this purpose include one from Corsica using a naval ship and a series of high-speed TGV trains from Grand-Est to other regions.

India 

Throughout the COVID-19 pandemic in India, the country's central and state governments coordinated numerous international and domestic evacuations. The Indian government initiated a massive evacuation program called "Vande Bharat Mission" on 7 May 2020. This involved flights via Air India and its low-cost arm Air India Express. In the first three phases of the mission, the government did not allow private airlines to participate, though they have been allowed to participate in the fourth phase onwards. The government continues to set the fare, determine the routes and decide the number of flights.

Over 67,000 evacuation requests were registered by MEA by 8 May 2020; twenty days later, the number of registrations had increased to over 300,000. It was initially predicted that the total number of civilians evacuated could surpass the Kuwait airlift, with estimates ranging from 192,000 to 250,000. On 6 August, the MEA declared that almost 950,000 Indians were repatriated.

Philippines 

The national and local governments of Philippines have established and facilitated a program to evacuate its citizens and local migrant workers from COVID-19 hit regions to their home provinces.

Controversies and issues

Quarantine locations
Australian Prime Minister Scott Morrison announced plans in late January 2020 to quarantine Australian citizens evacuated from Wuhan, including children and the elderly, for a period of 14 days on Christmas Island. The decision to repatriate those citizens using controversial detention facilities formerly used to detain asylum seekers before they were shut down in 2018 has received criticism. Controversially, the government plan also necessitates those evacuees to pay a fee of A$1,000, and would take them to Perth after the quarantine period, where they would need to arrange their own transportation back to their home cities. The Australian Medical Association, in a statement on the same day, stated that the decision to hold Australian citizens in "a place where has been previously the focus of populations under enormous mental and physical trauma and anguish, is not a really appropriate solution."

In some places, local residents rallied against the decision to quarantine evacuees in their region. Residents of Nautana protested against the Indonesian government in early February 2020 for letting the evacuees stay there. Hundreds staged demonstrations and burned tires. As a result, Brimob and Indonesian National Armed Forces troops were deployed to ensure stable security conditions. To protect and give health assurance to local people, President Joko Widodo ordered Health Minister Terawan Agus Putranto to open a temporary office in Natuna.

In the Philippines, the usage of the New Clark City development as a quarantine site was met with opposition from the municipal council of Capas. The local legislative said that they were not consulted by the national Department of Health and the Bases Conversion and Development Authority regarding the plan and suggested the national government to consider a more isolated area as a quarantine site.

After healthy Ukrainian evacuees returned from Wuhan to Ukraine on 20 February 2020, misinformation caused riots as protestors railed against the decision to quarantine the passengers nearby the day after they flew back, and the evacuees' bus was attacked.

Fees and payment responsibility
Due to the nature of evacuation flights, being flown empty one-way and being arranged by charter airlines in many cases at short notice, many passengers have had to pay substantial fees for a seat. Notably, the U.S. Department of State couldn't show that the prices it charged passengers for some chartered flights complied with its fare policy because it didn't have written guidance for calculating and documenting actual costs. In the United States, a bill was introduced in Congress to propose waiving travel expenses for US citizens evacuated. and in Nigeria, flights have been subsidised by the government. Indian migrant workers also suffered with high prices, which were compounded by their lack of income due to the lockdown and economic downturn. In response, the Jharkhand government and Congress Party branch said it would pay train fares for migrants leaving the state as well as organise special trains for residents to get to their hometowns.

Improper procedures 
In the United States, a Department of Health and Human Services employee claimed that the workers who received Americans from the first evacuation from Wuhan were inadequately trained and equipped.

Notes

References

International responses to the COVID-19 pandemic
Evacuations
COVID-19 pandemic-related lists